Aydin Mahammad-agha (Mammadagha) oghlu Rajabov (born April 9, 1944) is a carpet artist, head of the "Decorative-applied art" department of the Union of Artists of Azerbaijan, Honored Artist of the Republic of Azerbaijan.

Biography 
Aydin Rajabov was born on April 9, 1944, in Baku. He graduated from the Azerbaijan State Art School named after A. Azimzade in 1966 and in the same year entered the architectural faculty of the Polytechnic Institute. From the second year he continued his education at the carpet department of the Azerbaijan State Institute of Arts named after M. A. Aliyev and graduated in 1972.

The artist was elected a member of the Artists' Union of the USSR in 1975, and a member of the Presidium of the Union of Artists of Azerbaijan in 1991. In 2012, he was appointed head of the "Decorative and Applied Arts" department of the Union of Artists of Azerbaijan.

Career 
Aydin Rajabov was a student of carpet artist Latif Karimov. In addition, he formed his own creative style and based his work on the synthesis of tradition and modernity. In his carpet and pattern work, the main focus is on the sources of poetry, medieval miniature traditions and compositional structure of Azerbaijan. Such works of the artist include "Shirin's arrival in Bisotun", "Spring girl", "Oriental beauty", "Ud performer", "Chovken game", "Shahin elchiliyi" and others.

In addition, "Astrologers", "Fig Tree", "Cavalry Dervish", "Dur Horse", "White Camel Carrying the Sun", "Sacrificial Ram", "Old Farmer", "Abstract Gimil", "World Tree or Almond tree ", "Simurg", "Phaeton driver", "Interlocutors men" have a special place in the artist's work.

Aydin Rajabov's solo exhibitions were held in Baku and Stockholm in 2005.

He participated in national and international exhibitions with his carpets. The works of the carpet artist are kept in museums of Azerbaijan and in various private collections in Germany, Turkey, Italy, Spain, Switzerland, France and other countries.

Awards 
 Honored Artist of the Republic of Azerbaijan — December 29, 2006
 "Soltan Mahammad" Award — 2007

References 

1944 births
21st-century Azerbaijani painters
Living people